Roderick Donald McKindlay (25 October 1935 – 18 March 2015) was an Australian rules footballer who played with North Melbourne in the Victorian Football League (VFL).

He died in 2015.

Notes

External links 

1935 births
Australian rules footballers from Victoria (Australia)
North Melbourne Football Club players
Maryborough Football Club players
2015 deaths